Robert Nikolic (born 1 August 1968) is a German former professional footballer who played as a defender. He spent four seasons in the Bundesliga with Borussia Dortmund and 1. FSV Mainz 05, notably spending 13 years out of the top flight before making a return.

Honours
Borussia Dortmund
 DFB-Pokal: 1988–89

References

1968 births
Living people
Sportspeople from Bonn
German footballers
Footballers from North Rhine-Westphalia
Association football defenders
Borussia Dortmund players
Borussia Dortmund II players
FC St. Pauli players
Rot-Weiß Oberhausen players
KFC Uerdingen 05 players
1. FSV Mainz 05 players
SV Darmstadt 98 players
Bundesliga players
2. Bundesliga players